Beroroha is a district of Atsimo-Andrefana in Madagascar.

Roads
Beroroha lies on the Mangoky river. The road to Beroroha (National road 15) is unpaved and can only be taken by 4x4 pick-ups.

Municipalities
The district is further divided into nine municipalities:
 Behisatra (Behisatsy)
 Bemavo
 Beroroha
 Fanjakana
 Mandronarivo
 Marerano
 Sakena
 Tanamary
 Tanandava

Tourist sights
The Makay Massif is situated in the district of Beroroha.

References 

Districts of Atsimo-Andrefana